Automobile Welt Eisenach is a car museum located in the old East German town of Eisenach adjacent to the banks of the Hörsel river. It is situated on the old Automobilwerk Eisenach factory site, one of the world's oldest, and opened as a museum in 2005 utilising building O2 from 1936.

Exhibits

The museum chronicles the history of car manufacturing in Eisenach from 1899, through the Dixi and BMW pre-war years, and the development of the GDR car industry with EMW, IFA and Wartburg, and the post-unification Opel models.

References

External links

Automobile museums in Germany
Museums in Thuringia
Eisenach
Museums established in 2005
2005 establishments in Germany